Gerard Henderson (born 1945) is an Australian author, columnist and political commentator. He founded and is executive director of The Sydney Institute, a privately funded Australian current affairs forum.

Education and earlier career
Henderson attended Xavier College in Melbourne, before studying arts and law at the University of Melbourne and completing a PhD.

Henderson taught at the Tasmania and La Trobe universities before working for four years on the staff of Kevin Newman in the Fraser Government. He moved to the Department of Industrial Relations in 1980; from 1984 to 1986 he was chief-of-staff to John Howard, during which time Howard was deputy leader, then leader, of the Liberal Party of Australia.

The Keating Government appointed Henderson to the board of the Australia Foundation for Culture and the Humanities. Later, the Howard government appointed him to the Foreign Affairs Council. He was one of the people invited to Kevin Rudd's Australia 2020 Summit held in April 2008.

Works

For several years, Henderson had a weekly column in The Sydney Morning Herald. He also writes "Media Watch Dog", a weekly compendium of media criticism, written from the perspective of a blue heeler named Nancy. In December 2013, his column moved to The Weekend Australian, which also carries Media Watch Dog.

He has written several books.
 Mr Santamaria and the Bishops (Hale & Iremonger, 1982)
 Australian Answers (Random House Australia, 1990)
 Gerard Henderson Scribbles On (Wilkinson Books, 1993)
 Menzies' Child: The Liberal Party of Australia (HarperCollins, 1994;)
 A Howard Government? Inside the Coalition (HarperCollins, 1995)
 B. A. Santamaria (HarperCollins, 2005)
 Santamaria: A Most Unusual Man (MUP, 2015)
 Cardinal Pell, the Media Pile-On & Collective Guilt (Connor Court Publishing, 2021)

Media appearances
In 1994, Henderson profiled former prime minister Bob Hawke for the ABC TV program Four Corners. He was a regular political commentator on radio, and appeared occasionally on Insiders, another ABC TV program. In early 2020, Henderson was dropped from the show after new host David Speers reportedly wanted to try new conservative voices amid claims from sources in the ABC that Henderson failed to sufficiently engage with issues during panel discussions.

Views
In 2006, Henderson said John Howard had lost the ongoing culture wars, writing, "In my view, there is only one area where the Coalition has failed to have a significant impact – namely, in what some have termed 'the culture wars'." He has supported the movement for Australia to become a republic.

References

External links
 Gerard Henderson columns in The Sydney Morning Herald 
 Media Watch Dog archive

1945 births
Living people
Journalists from Melbourne
Bloggers from Melbourne
Australian columnists
The Australian journalists
Australian public servants
People educated at Xavier College
University of Melbourne alumni
Conservatism in Australia
Australian republicans
Academic staff of the University of Tasmania
Academic staff of La Trobe University
People from Balwyn, Victoria